Kirkton is a residential housing scheme located in the north of Dundee. The area is bordered by Downfield to the west, Trottick to the east and Fairmuir to the south.

Background

Education 
There are two primary schools in Kirkton; Sidlaw View and Downfield Primary. There are also two secondary schools in Kirkton; Baldragon Academy and St. Paul's RC Academy. The Kingsway Campus of Dundee College is located in the South of Kirkton

Transport 
Kirkton is in the northern terminus for the 18 Xplore Dundee bus service from Kirkton Asda to City Centre.

History 

A riot took place in Kirkton on 31 October 2022 which injured a handful of people and saw the use of fireworks being banned from supermarkets in Dundee following the riot.

References

Areas of Dundee